PJ Trailers is a US-based trailer manufacturer founded by Peter Thiesen in 1991. PJ Trailers is headquartered in Paris, Texas, where its main production facilities are also located. The company sells trailers at over 250 dealerships and retail outlets in North America. The company also has a manufacturing facility in Mount Orab, Ohio and Mexico.

References 

Companies based in Texas